Iron Horse is an American Western television series that appeared on ABC from 1966 to 1968 and starred Dale Robertson as fictional gambler-turned-railroad baron Ben Calhoun. Costars included Gary Collins, Robert Random and Ellen Burstyn (who was billed as Ellen McRae). The series pilot was released as the film Scalplock.

Synopsis
The plot centered on Calhoun's poker game-win of the incomplete Buffalo Pass, Scalplock, & Defiance Railroad and his attempts to finish the line despite ever-present obstacles.

A running subplot was Calhoun's frequent and (for TV at that time) flagrant sexual dalliances with his many attractive female guest stars, as well as his steadier on and off arrangement with Julie Parsons, played by Ellen Burstyn.  Though he was never shown in bed with any of them, there was little doubt about what was happening between scenes; and marriage was never proposed as a possibility.  The second season minimized Calhoun's sexual exploits somewhat, perhaps in response to viewer complaints.

Much of the external footage involving trains was shot on the historic Sierra Railroad in and around Jamestown and Sonora, California.

The filming was produced by Screen Gems.

Cast

Guest stars 
Walter Maslow, as Dimas Mott in "Right of Way Through Paradise" (1966)
Hoyt Axton, as Slash Birney in "Right of Way Through Paradise" (1966)
Karen Black, as Patricia Dunne in "The Prisoners" (1967)
Ahna Capri, Angie in "Steel Chain to a Music Box" (1967)
Pat Conway, formerly Sheriff Clay Hollister on the ABC and then syndicated western, Tombstone Territory.
Dennis Cross as Jim Vail in "Town Full of Fear"
Sharon Farrell as Carrie in "The Pembrooke Blood" (1967)
Celia Kaye as Emily in "Decision at Sundown"
Don Keefer as Blake and Barbara Stuart as Lil Kane in "Sister Death" (1967)
Douglas Kennedy, as Adam Preston in "The Bridge at Forty-Mile" (1967), with X Brands as Juanito in the same episode
John M. Pickard, as Sergeant Terry in "War Cloud" and as Bulwer in "Through Ticket to Gunsight" (both 1966)
Judson Pratt as Brady in "Wild Track" (1967)
Mike Ragan as Cantley in "The Prisoners' (1967)
Arthur Space as Andy in "Gallows for Bill Pardew" (1967)
Lurene Tuttle as Mrs. Emerson in "Sister Death" (1967)
Michael Witney as Jared Hobson in "The Execution" (1967)
Tony Young appeared three times, as Shad in "No Wedding Bells for Tony" (1966), Red Shirt (uncredited) in "Hellcat" (also 1966), and as Tower in "Banner with a Strange Device (1967).

Episode list

Pilot: 1966
 Scalplock /

Season 1: 1966–67

Season 2: 1967–68

Home media 
On October 2, 2012 Sony Pictures Home Entertainment was due to release the first season of the series on DVD through an online manufacture-on-demand program via Amazon.com and Warner Bros, Archives, but this release has been delayed.

References

 The Movie Railroads. Jensen, Larry (1981 - Darwin Publications)

External links
 
 

American Broadcasting Company original programming
1966 American television series debuts
1968 American television series endings
Television series by Sony Pictures Television
1960s Western (genre) television series
English-language television shows
Trains in fiction
Television series by Screen Gems
Television shows filmed in California